Brahmastram  is a 2006 Telugu-language action film, produced by Nukarapu Surya Prakasa Rao on S. P. Creations banner and directed by Surya Kiran. Starring Jagapati Babu, Neha Oberoi and music composed by Vaibhava.

Plot
Bangaram an amnesia kid tieing a Hindu holy Hindu wedding chain Mangalsutra to his wrest is raised by a cut-throat gangster Rudra. Gazing that he turns into a raging bull, and an unstoppable machine whenever the wedding chain is taken off Rudra molds him as an ultimate weapon. Years roll by and Bangaram is growing up unkempt, uncivilized, cannot even speak properly, and is strictly kept in a cage. Besides, Vasudev a blind pianist resides with his daughter Gayatri and owns an instrumental shop. On trafficking, Bangaram is attracted to Vasu Dev’s music and enters his shop where he gets some bondage with the piano. 

After a while, Rudra’s gang encounters a turf war which leaves bloody carnage. However, Bangaram absconds with deadly wounds and lands at Vasudev. Since he is the second one, he is familiar that rescues and shelters him. Gayatri sculpts him how as a real man in civilized society, and calls him Guru. In her acquaintance, he enjoys gladsomeness and adores Gayatri whose word is an ordinance. Foregoing, she too reciprocates Guru’s innocent and naïve ways of looking at life and falls for him. At that time, Vasudev stands an opportunity to regain his sight which requires ₹5 lakhs and it is pricy for Gayatri. Just when Rudra & his men escaped from death intended to recapture Guru but to avail.

Meanwhile, Guru & Gayatri visits an old church where his memories haunt him and recognize his mother Thulasi’s photograph. Through the church father, they are aware that Thulasi is a volunteer who is brutally killed by her husband, out of suspicion. Being conscious of it, the Guru freaks out on Rudra about the whereabouts of his father. Whereat, Rudra artifices him by assuring him to catch but for which he should move according to him. Guru borrows the needed amount for Vasudev's operation from Rudra and secretly makes the payment. Next, Rudra misuses him as a killing machine in an underground fight club. Simultaneously, Vasudev recoups his vision when Guru walks to see him but Gayatri expels him. Knowledging that flabbergastingly, Vasudev is the true father of Guru which she has learned from the church father. Following, she divulges the actuality to Vasudev. In tandem, Guru is severely injured when Vasudev & Gayatri rushes to the hospital. Here, Vasudev declares himself as his father which he does not believe, seeks truth and he moves rearward. 

25 years ago, Vasudev a soldier knitted Thulasi with a love match and Gayatri is the daughter of his bestie colleague. At one time, when they are on duty at the border Rudra mortifies Gayatri's mother publicly when Thulasi strikes and sentences him. Later Gayatri's father passes away and beholding her mother also dies when Vasudev joins Gayatri at an orphanage. The same night, Rudra backstabs Vasudev and attempts to molest Thulasi. As inevitable, Vasudev shoots Thulasi on her necessitate to protect his wife's chastity. Here tragically, Vasudev lost his vision and Guru his memory who is abducted by Rudra. Vasudev must pay a short-term penalty and after returning he adopted Gayatri. Listening to it, Guru embraces his father when Rudra pounces on Guru and he collapses. During that plight, Gayatri removes the wedding chain from his wrest and orders to eliminate the malevolent. At last, Guru blasts and ceases them. Finally, the movie ends on a happy note with Gayatri asking Guru to tie that wedding chain to her neck.

Cast
Jagapati Babu as Guru / Bangaram
Neha Oberoi as Gayatri
Navya Natarajan as Nimmi
Kalabhavan Mani as Vasudev
Ashish Vidyarthi as Rudra
Kota Srinivasa Rao
Brahmanandam
M. S. Narayana
Raghu Babu as A.K.47
Venu Madhav
Satyam Rajesh
Kavitha as Doctor
Sujitha
Master Priyansh Murarishetty (Bunny) as Junior Guru / Junior Bangaram
Master Saajan K Charles (Junior Bangaram/Guru)

Soundtrack

Music composed by Vaibhav. Lyrics written by Bhaskarbhatla Ravikumar Music released on MADHURA Audio Company.

References

2000s Telugu-language films
Indian remakes of American films
2006 films
2006 action films
Indian action films